The Campeonato Argentino de Rugby 1982 was won by the selection of Buenos Aires that beat in the final the selection of Unión de Rugby de Tucumàn

Rugby Union in Argentina in 1982

National 
 The Buenos Aires Champsionship was won by C.A.S.I.
 The Cordoba Province Championship was won by Tala and Córdoba AC
 The North-East Championship was won by Lawn Tennis

International
 The Sudamérica XV made his second tour in South Africa. The team (a masked version of Argentine national team) obtained an historical victory in the second test in Bloemfontein (21-12).
 The Argentine national team visited at the end of the year to France and Spain. Not a great tour with two loss with France.

Preliminaries

Poule 1

Poule 2

,

Poule 3

Poule 4

Interzone

Semifinals

Third place final

Final

Tucuman: L. Ferro, G. Taran, P. Zalarrayan, F. Garcia, P. Bleckwedel, R. Saute, P. Merlo, G.Pelau, M. Ricci, H. Cabrera, O. Fascioli, R. De Luca, D. Gomez, L. De Chazal, L. Molino
  Buenos Aires: E. Sanguinoti, M. Campo, R. Madero, M. Loffreda, A. Cappelletti, H. Porta, A. Scaras, Goche, R. de Vedis, T. Petersen, E. Ure, A. Iachetti, G. Treveglini, S. Dengra, A. Courregas, P. Devoto.

External links 
 Memorias de la UAR 1982
  Francesco Volpe, Paolo Pacitti (Author), Rugby 2000, GTE Gruppo Editorale (1999)

Campeonato Argentino de Rugby
Argentina
Rugby